Ángel Jiménez may refer to:

Ángel Jiménez (sailor) (born 1961), Cuban Olympic sailor
Ángel Jiménez (footballer) (born 2002), Spanish footballer
Ángel Jiménez (long jumper), Cuban paralympic athlete

See also
Ángela Jiménez (1886-1990), Mexican soldier during the Mexican revolution
Ángel Giménez (born 1955), Spanish tennis player